Rhiannon Kate Pearce is an Australian politician. She has been a Labor member of the South Australian House of Assembly since the 2022 state election, representing King.

Early and personal life
Pearce grew up in Telowie in the state's Mid North and attended high school at St Mark's College in Port Pirie before moving to Adelaide at age 18 to study economics. She worked as a Community Engagement Advisor for then opposition Leader Peter Malinauskas.

Pearce is married to Todd and has two children.

Political career
Pearce was elected at the 2022 state election to represent King. She replaced the Liberal politician, Paula Luethen, who had held the seat since 2018. She was supported in her campaign by the mentorship through Emily's List Australia.

On 24 March 2022, the new Premier, Peter Malinauskas, announced his Cabinet, with Pearce appointed as assistant minister to Deputy Premier Susan Close.

References 

Living people
Year of birth missing (living people)
Members of the South Australian House of Assembly
Women members of the South Australian House of Assembly
21st-century Australian politicians
21st-century Australian women politicians